I Am a Singer (season 3), is a Chinese TV series produced by Hunan TV. The show was launched in 2015, and aired every Friday at 10:00 pm. The program was produced by Hong Tao, and the show's music director was Kubert Leung. In 2015, Liby Enterprise Group paid 3 million to acquire exclusive naming rights for the program, compared to Season 2 (0.65 million).

There were minor changes to the rules of competition for this season, including the debut of the "Challenge Round", where singers had to finish in a certain position to be allowed to remain in the competition. This season saw an increase of the number of contestants, at 13, up from 12 from the previous season.

The season premiered on January 2, 2015. and ended on April 3, 2015. Han Hong was named the winner of the competition on the finals aired March 27, 2015, and Han was the first female winner of the series. Li Jian and The One came in as first and second runners-up.

Competition rules
The Qualifying and Knockout rounds were retained as part of the show's format. As with previous seasons, the combined vote count from both the Qualifying and Knockout rounds determined which singer was eliminated on the night. Introduced in the last season, was contestants hosting roles; this season featured Leo Ku and Sun Nan as the hosts, which had a comedian manager selected by the show's producers.

Challenge round
As the show is being revamped into a new "2+1" format, the +1 was announced as "Challenge Round", which follows after each Knockout. A new Challenger enter the competition taking place for the previously eliminated singer with a twist where the singer requiring to beat a majority of singers (i.e. ranking in top four or better) or face elimination. If the Challenger was successful, the seven incumbent singers were placed in risk of elimination, while votes cast from the Knockout rounds do not carry forward to the Challenge round. Like eliminated singers, unsuccessful challengers (unless elected to withdraw) were also entitled to return performance and taking part in the Breakouts.

To promote the new Challenge round, singers were open for registration via social media. The first singer, Golden Melody Award Newcomer Award winner Li Ronghao took advantage of the registration which helped other singers to promote the program and register themselves for the competition. The show's official social media website, Sina Weibo revealed that over 60 singers had registered for the show at the close of the registration, but also told only one singer would actually get to participate in the show.

Singer voting
Singers can cast their votes for the top three performances before the results were announced. Singer voting did not affect the outcome of the competition and did not count toward the audience's vote count. The singer who finished first in the Singer voting won prizes from a sponsor, or entitled to advantage in the next round.

Contestants
The following singers participated in the third season are listed in alphabetical order (singers without a placement for the final is listed as finalist, and singers withdrew were listed as withdrawn):

Key:
 – Winner
 – Runner-up
 – Third place
 – Other finalist
 – Withdrew
 – Withdrew (Initially eligible for Breakout round but did not participate)

Future appearances
Han Hong, Li Jian, The One, Sitar Tan, Tiger Hu and A-Lin all returned as guest performers on the biennial concert on the following season. Li returned again as a contestant on the fifth season. Han, Kit Chan, A-Lin and Sitar Tan appeared as guest performers on the fifth, sixth and seventh seasons, respectively.

Results

Details of competitions

1st round

Qualifying
Taping Date: December 20, 2014
Airdate: January 2, 2015,
The order of performance for this episode was determined by Han Hong, which the 500-member audience voted for the singer who gave the best first impression.

Knockout
Taping Date: December 28, 2014
Airdate: January 9, 2015

Overall ranking

 A. Had a one vote difference between 3rd place singer.
 B. Had a three vote difference between 3rd place singer.

Challenge
Taping Date: January 8, 2015
Airdate: January 16, 2015,
Singer Li Ronghao was the first-ever challenger of I Am a Singer. Jane Zhang would have been eliminated for finishing last, however, Li was unsuccessful in his challenge (finished 6th) and was eliminated instead.

2nd round

Qualifying
Taping Date: January 15, 2015
Airdate: January 23, 2015  
Li Jian was the first substitute singer of the season. For this episode, the performance order was determined by Leo Ku, who finished first last week. Jian was originally going to perform  "傳奇" this week, but later scrapped during rehearsals, citing that the song was 'meaningless' to the competition.

Knockout
Taping Date: January 22, 2015
Airdate: January 30, 2015

 A. Voted 7th in the 20s age group
 B. Voted 3rd in the 40s age group
 C. Voted 1st in the 10+ age group
 D. Voted 5th in the 20s age group
 E. Voted 1st in the 30s age group
 F. Voted 1st in the 40s age group

Overall ranking

 A. Has one vote difference between 2nd place singer.
 B. Has three vote difference between 3rd place singer.

Challenge
Taping Date: January 29, 2015
Airdate: February 6, 2015 
Singer Sitar Tan was the second challenger of the season.

3rd round

Qualifying
Taping Date: February 5, 2015
Airdate: February 13, 2015 
The One was the second substitute singer of the season.

Knockout
Taping Date: February 12, 2015
Airdate: February 20, 2015 

 A. Voted 1st in the 50s age group
 B. Voted 1st in the 10+ and 20s age group
 C. Voted 2nd in the 20s age group, and 1st in the 30s and 40s age group

Overall ranking

Challenge (Ultimate Challenge Round)
Taping Date: February 13, 2015
Airdate: February 27, 2015 
Jess Lee was the third and final challenger of the season.

During the results, this round came to have produced the narrowest margin of 26 votes between the top five performers in I Am a Singer history, as Tan, Han, The One, A-Lin and Lee, received 241, 232, 232, 216 and 215 votes, respectively (percentages were 16.14%, 15.51%, 15.51%, 14.43% and 14.36%, respectively); by a one-vote difference, Lee was eliminated for failing the challenge (and Sun Nan, who would have been eliminated for finishing last, was safe).

4th round

Qualifying (Ultimate Qualifying Round)
Taping Date: February 20, 2015
Airdate: March 6, 2015
Hsiao Huang Chi was the third and final substitute singer of the season. During this episode, Sun decided to rewrite the lyrics on his performance, "全部的愛", to dedicate his daughter.

Knockout (Ultimate Knockout Round)
Taping Date: February 27, 2015
Airdate: March 13, 2015,
During this episode, Jian's manager was temporarily replaced by Eliza Liang as Shen Mengchen was absent during tapings to host the 2015 Hunan Television special The Lantern Festival Show.

Overall ranking

Breakout
Taping Date: March 12, 2015
Airdate: March 20, 2015,
Three of the six singers who were initial singers (A-Lin, Han and Sun) were exempt for this round, while the other three singers participated with previously eliminated singers for a chance to enter the finals. The order was determined based on the contestant's status quo and their duration on the stage. All but five singers went through ballot to decide the order; Hsiao, Jian and The One selected their performance freely, while unsuccessful challengers (Ronghao and Lee) were defaulted to the first two performances. Zhang was initially eligible to participate, but later declined due to her decision to focus on her new album release on March 11, 2015.

The singers sang one song, with the four singers having the most votes qualifying for the finals. During the results, the initial vote count (media) revealed that Jian was ranked first, followed by The One, Tan, and Ku. Initial vote count (managers) revealed that Li Jian was ranked first, The One and Tan were tied for second, and Hsiao and Ronghao were tied for fourth.

After the final results were released, Jian, Tan, Hu and The One were the top four singers receiving the highest number of votes and advanced to the finals.

Final Round
Airdate: March 27, 2015 
The Finals was divided into two rounds, with the first song being a duet with a guest singer, and the second song being a solo encore performance. For the first time in I Am a Singer history, votes were the sole determinant towards the results, and the winner is determined on which singer received a higher accumulated votes.

1st round
The first round of the finals was the guest singers' duet. The order was determined through balloting, The singer receiving the lowest number of votes after the first round was eliminated from the competition; A-Lin would have been eliminated for finishing last; however, she was later advanced to the 2nd round after Sun withdraw from the competition prior to the results due to personal reasons, citing about his placement in the round. Had it not been for Sun Nan's withdrawal, he would've performed "白天不懂夜的黑" as his encore song.

 A. Sun withdrew from the competition prior to the results. He was ranked fourth during this round, but his performance was excluded from the tally.

2nd round
The second round of the finals was the encore song segment. The order of performance for this round was determined by the "First and Last" duel sequence based on the results of the first round, with the order being: 3rd, 4th, 2nd, 5th, 1st and 6th.

Overall ranking (winner of battle)
Before the final results were announced, the host named The One, Jian and Han as the "Ultimate Winner Candidates". Han was declared the winner with 44.35% of the votes, beating Jian's 33.06% and The One's 22.58% of the votes cast. The percentages reflected in the table counted only the votes of the three aforementioned singers.

Biennial Concert
Airdate: April 3, 2015 
The concert featured 12 singers from the three seasons: Huang Qishan and Aska Yang from Season 1; Han Lei, Gary Chaw, Jason Zhang and Bibi Zhou from Season 2; and the top six finalists (Han, Jian, The One, Tan, Hu and A-Lin) from Season 3.

Ratings

|-
|1
|
|2.757
|12.234
|2 
|1.7
|10.17
|1
|-
|2
|
|2.407
|
|3
|1.57
|9.57
|1
|-
|3
|
|2.489
|11.005
|2
|1.52
|
|1
|-
|4
|
|2.633
|11.804
|1
|1.64
|9.6
|1
|-
|5
|
|3.080
|14.237
|1
|2.02
|12.15
|1
|-
|6
|
|3.083
|
|1
|1.72
|11.58
|1
|-
|7
|
|2.897
|13.898
|1
|2.04
|
|1
|-
|8
|
|
|11.906
|1
|1.77
|10.46
|1
|-
|9
|
|2.637
|13.102
|1
|1.65
|10.55
|1
|-
|10
|
|2.532
|12.457
|1
|1.69
|10.60
|1
|-
|11
|
|2.492
|12.141
|1
|1.58
|10.20
|1
|-
|12
|
|2.516
|12.682
|1
|1.44
|9.69
|1
|-
|13
|
|
|11.27
|1
|
|9.09
|1
|-
|SP1
|
|2.540
|14.68
|1
|
|10.91
|1

References

2015 Chinese television seasons
2015 in Chinese music
Singer (TV series)